The following tables list the point distributions used in the FedEx Cup during the regular season and playoffs, as well as the starting score vs par element of the FedEx Cup's Tour Championship.

Regular point distribution
Only golfers who make the first cut for an event will receive points for that event.  In case of a two-cut system (used if 78 or more players make the cut after two rounds), the low 70 and ties advance to the final round, and players who do not advance to the fourth round after the second cut receive points.  At the AT&T Pebble Beach Pro-Am, where only 60 players make the cut after three rounds, players in the standings who do not make the cut and are between 61st and 70th (and ties) will also receive points. In case of a tie, point totals are added together and divided among all golfers tied for a particular position at the end of a tournament. For example, if four golfers finish tied for fifth place, the fifth through eighth place points are summed and divided by four, with each of the golfers receiving the same number of points. The points system was last changed at the start of the 2016-17 season, mostly reducing the number of points awarded for finishes outside the top 15.

Playoff point distribution 
Only golfers who make the cut for an event will receive points for that event.

Beginning in 2015, playoff tournaments carry four times the points of regular season tournaments, instead of five times, as was the case from 2009 to 2014. In 2020, playoff tournaments only carried three times the points of regular season tournaments due to the season having less tournaments.

Tour Championship starting score
After the first two playoff events, the ranked position of each player determines their starting score for The Tour Championship relative to par.

FedEx Cup reward distribution

See also
List of former point distributions of the FedEx Cup

References

FedEx Cup